Mona Das (born 1971) is an American politician who served a member of the Washington State Senate from the 47th district. Elected in 2018, she assumed office on January 14, 2019.

Early life and education 
Mona Das was born in Munger, Bihar, India. Her family immigrated to the United States when she was eight months old. She graduated from the University of Cincinnati with a Bachelor of Arts in psychology. For 15 years, she operated her own mortgage loan business, MOXY Money. She received a Master of Business Administration in sustainable business from Pinchot University in 2012.

Career 
In 2018 she ran for the Washington State Senate in the 47th district as a Democrat against incumbent Republican Senator Joe Fain, after dropping out of the crowded race for Washington's 8th congressional district. She narrowly won the election, with 28,394 votes to Fain's 27,413. She is retiring in 2022.

References

External links
Official website

1971 births
Date of birth missing (living people)
Living people
American politicians of Indian descent
Asian-American people in Washington (state) politics
University of Cincinnati alumni
Pinchot University alumni
21st-century American politicians
Democratic Party Washington (state) state senators
Women state legislators in Washington (state)
21st-century American women politicians